Pangani is a town in Tanzania.

Pangani may also refer to:

 Pangani A
 Pangani (ward)
 Pangani, Nairobi, a neighbourhood in Kenya.